Klaus Diederichs has been Head of European Investment Banking at JP Morgan Chase & Co. from April 2004 to 2014.  Mr. Diederichs served as Director of Credit Services of Capital Market, Institutional Restructuring Unit, Risk Management and Credit Risk of Dresdner Bank Luxembourg S.A. He serves as a Director of JPMorgan Cazenove Limited.

Education
Dietrich graduated from the University of Mannheim with a degree in business administration.

Sources
 Executive profile - Business Week
 

English bankers
Living people
British male sailors (sport)
Year of birth missing (living people)